William H. West (February 13, 1928 – August 22, 2016) was an American educator and politician.

West was born in Hornbeck, Vernon Parish, Louisiana and graduated from Leesville High School in Leesville, Louisiana. He received his bachelor's degree in biology from Northwestern State University. West served in the United States Army and was a medic instructor. He was a teacher, coach, and principal with the Vernon Parish school system. West also taught nursing at the Northwestern University, He served in the Louisiana House of Representatives from 1978 to 1984 for two terms and was a Democrat. He died in Praireville, Ascension Parish, Louisiana.

References

1928 births
2016 deaths
People from Vernon Parish, Louisiana
Military personnel from Louisiana
Northwestern State University alumni
Educators from Louisiana
Democratic Party members of the Louisiana House of Representatives